Sir John Perronet Thompson, KCSI, KCIE (8 March 1873 – 8 August 1935) was a British administrator in India. A member of the Indian Civil Service, he was Political Secretary to the Government of India from 1922 to 1927 and Chief Commissioner of Delhi from 1928 to 1932.

He was educated at Leeds Grammar School and Trinity College, Cambridge; at Cambridge he was President of the Cambridge Union.

References 
 "Sir John Thompson", The Times, 9 August 1935, p. 12
 "Sir John Thompson", The Daily Telegraph, 9 August 1935, p. 13

1873 births
1935 deaths
Indian Civil Service (British India) officers
Knights Commander of the Order of the Star of India
Knights Commander of the Order of the Indian Empire
People educated at Leeds Grammar School
Alumni of Trinity College, Cambridge
Presidents of the Cambridge Union
Members of the Council of State (India)
British people in colonial India